José Enrique Porto Lareo (born 21 October 1977 in Vigo) is a vision impaired track cyclist from Spain.

Career
At the London 2012 Summer Paralympics, Porto teamed with sighted pilot José Antonio Villanueva in the tandem cycling events, where the pair won the silver medal in the Men's 1 km Time Trial and the bronze medal in the Men's Sprint.

At the 2016 UCI Para-cycling Track World Championships, in Montichiari, Italy, Porto won a bronze medal in the Sprint event.

Awards
In 2013, in recognition of his dedication to sport and his achievements at the 2012 Paralympics, Porto was awarded the silver Spanish Royal Order of Sports Merit.

References

External links 
 
 

Cyclists at the 2012 Summer Paralympics
Paralympic gold medalists for Spain
1977 births
Living people
Sportspeople from Vigo
Medalists at the 2012 Summer Paralympics
Paralympic silver medalists for Spain
Paralympic bronze medalists for Spain
Spanish male cyclists
Paralympic medalists in cycling
Paralympic cyclists of Spain
Cyclists from Galicia (Spain)